Monyake is a community council located in the Mohale's Hoek of Lesotho. Its population in 2006 was 12,234.

Under the previous administrations, the community used to fall under the Mafeteng District, but under the new demarcation, this village has been moved to the Mohale's Hoek district, with other villages such as Ha Panta, Ha Lengolo remaining under Thabana-Morena within the Mafeteng District.

Villages
The community of Monyake includes the villages of

References

External links
 Google map of community villages

Populated places in Mafeteng District